Hendrik van Rossum (14 December 1919 – 17 June 2017) was a Dutch politician who served in the House of Representatives from 1967 to 1986 as a member of the Reformed Political Party. From 1981 to 1986, he was Leader of the Reformed Political Party.

He died in Zeist on 17 June 2017, aged 97.

References

1919 births
2017 deaths
Members of the House of Representatives (Netherlands)
Leaders of the Reformed Political Party